Nicholas Barber (fl. 1414–1421), of Dunwich, Suffolk, was a Member of Parliament for Dunwich in April 1414, 1419 and December 1421.

References

14th-century births
15th-century deaths
15th-century English people
English MPs April 1414
English MPs 1419
People from Dunwich